Haplocochlias nunezi is a species of sea snail, a marine gastropod mollusk in the family Skeneidae.

Description
The height of the shell attains 5.2 mm.

Distribution
This species occurs in the Gulf of Mexico at depths up to 90 m; in the Atlantic Ocean off the Bahamas.

References

 Espinosa, J., J. Ortea and R. Fernández-Garcés. 2005. Descripción de tres nuevas especies del género Haplocochlias Carpenter, 1864 (Mollusca: Gastropoda). Avicennia 17: 71–76

External links

nunezi
Gastropods described in 2004